Are These Our Parents? is a 1944 American romantic drama film directed by William Nigh. It stars Helen Vinson, Lyle Talbot, Ivan Lebedeff.

Plot
A mother's preference for partying, boozing, and running around with an assortment of sleazy characters results in her neglecting her nubile teenage daughter, who subsequently finds herself mixed up with teenage boys, nightclub owners, and murder.

Cast
 Helen Vinson as Myra Salisbury
 Lyle Talbot as George Kent
 Ivan Lebedeff as Alexis Dolan
 Noel Neill as Terry Salisbury
 Richard Byron as Hal Bailey
 Emma Dunn as Ma Henderson
 Addison Richards as Clint Davis
 Anthony Warde as Sam Bailey
 Robin Raymond as Mona Larson
 Ian Wolfe as Pa Henderson
 Claire McDowell as Miss Winfield

See also
List of American films of 1944

References

External links

1944 films
American romantic drama films
1944 romantic drama films
Monogram Pictures films
American black-and-white films
1940s English-language films
Films directed by William Nigh
1940s American films